István Hatvani (1718–1786) was a Hungarian mathematician. He worked on developing some of the earliest elements of probability theory.

External links
Biography at University of St Andrews, Scotland

1718 births
1786 deaths
18th-century Hungarian mathematicians
Probability theorists
Istvan